Salu Kola (also Romanized as Salū Kolā) is a village in Esfivard-e Shurab Rural District, in the Central District of Sari County, Mazandaran Province, Iran. At the 2006 census, its population was 410, in 103 families.

References 

Populated places in Sari County